Ghilardi is an Italian surname. Notable people with the surname include:

 Alberto Ghilardi (1909–1971), Italian cyclist 
 Luigi Ghilardi (1805–1864), Italian general
 Rebecca Ghilardi (born 1999), Italian pair skater

See also 

 Gilardi
 Ghirardi

Italian-language surnames